Nicolás Giménez may refer to:

 Nicolás Giménez (footballer, born 1996), Argentine midfielder for Talleres de Córdoba
 Nicolás Giménez (footballer, born 1997), Argentine defender for Rosario Central
 Nicolás Giménez (footballer, born 2000), Venezuelan forward for Atlético Venezuela